Sigurd Bengt Langberg (29 October 1897 – 8 July 1954) was a Danish stage and film actor.

He was married to actress Karna Langberg and was the father of actors Ebbe and Jesper Langberg.

Filmography 
Han, hun og Hamlet (1922)
Ole Opfinders offer (1924)
Københavns Sherlock Holmes (1925)
Hendes Naade, Dragonen (1925)
 The Clown (1926)
Krudt med knald (1931)
Barken Margrethe af Danmark (1934)
Ud i den kolde sne (1934)
Week-End (1935)
De bør forelske Dem (1935)
Bag Københavns kulisser (1935)
Min kone er husar (1935)
Provinsen kalder (1935)
Snushanerne (1936)
Millionærdrengen (1936)
Sjette trækning (1936)
Mille, Marie og mig (1937)
Der var engang en vicevært (1937)
Alarm (1938)
Bolettes brudefærd (1938)
Blaavand melder storm (1938)
Under byens tage (1938)
En lille tilfældighed (1939)
De tre, måske fire (1939)
Genboerne (1939)
Komtessen på Stenholt (1939)
Sommerglæder (1940)
Familien Olsen (1940)
Pas på svinget i Solby (1940)
En desertør (1940)
En pige med pep (1940)
Alle går rundt og forelsker sig (1941)
Tobiasnætter (1941)
Thummelumsen (1941)
Tag til Rønneby kro (1941)
En mand af betydning (1941)
Peter Andersen (1941)
Forellen (1942)
Frøken Vildkat (1942)
Natekspressen (P. 903) (1942)
Afsporet – (1942)
Når bønder elsker (1942)
Kriminalassistent Bloch (1943)
Møllen (1943)
Det ender med bryllup (1943)
Biskoppen (1944)
Man elsker kun een gang (1945)
Den usynlige hær (1945)
Op med lille Martha (1946)
Hans store aften (1946)
Når katten er ude (1947)
Røverne fra Rold (1947)
Sikken en nat (1947)
Tre år efter (1948)
For frihed og ret (1949)
Det gælder os alle (1949)
Kampen mod uretten (1949)
Den opvakte jomfru (1950)
Mosekongen (1950)
Det gamle guld (1951)
Dorte (1951)
Vejrhanen (1952)
Husmandstøsen (1952)
Far til fire (1953)
Himlen er blå (1954)

External links

Danish male stage actors
Danish male film actors
Danish male silent film actors
20th-century Danish male actors
Male actors from Copenhagen
1897 births
1954 deaths